Nathin Art Butler is an Australian actor, writer and producer.  He has appeared in American and Australian films and TV series, including General Hospital and Hawaii Five-0.

Early life
Born in Australia, Butler grew up on a cattle ranch in Queensland. His father worked on the ranch and his mother was a country singer. As a child, Butler was interested in playing guitar and singing.  In high school, he participated in many theatrical productions. At age 17, Butler was accepted into National Institute of Dramatic Art.

Career
In 2008, at age 23, Butler moved to Los Angeles to pursue a professional career in acting.

Butler's most prominent television roles were that of Dr. Ewen Keenan in General Hospital and as Nick Towne in Hawaii Five-0.  His other film and television credits include X-Men: Origins, Australia, The Pacific, the Hulu series Casual, Winners & Losers" and Agents of S.H.I.E.L.D.  In 2020, Butler was to appear in season 3 of Westworld,

Butler has created several projects and was writing and producing an Australian true crime drama titled Far North.

Personal life
Butler resides with his wife Irina and two children in the Woodland Hills section of Los Angeles.

References

External links
 

Male actors from Queensland